Baroque and Roll is the sixteenth studio album by Acoustic Strawbs. Acoustic Strawbs were formed by accident after Dave Cousins and Brian Willoughby were booked to perform as a duo in Twickenham in 2000. Cousins damaged his wrist and Dave Lambert stepped in to cover while Cousins sang. The format was successful and tours were arranged. Brian Willoughby stepped down in 2004 to concentrate on his work with Cathryn Craig and he was replaced by Chas Cronk who added bass pedals and acoustic bass guitar as well as extra vocals and guitar.

Track listing
"Tears and Pavan"
"Tears" (Dave Cousins)
"Pavan" (Cousins, Richard Hudson, John Ford)
"Remembering" (John Hawken)
"You and I (When We Were Young)" (Cousins)
"Evergreen" (Cousins)
"Ghosts" (Cousins)
"Sweet Dreams"
"Night Light"
"Guardian Angel"
"Night Light"
"There Will Come the Day" (Cousins, Don Airey)
"Not All the Flowers Grow" (Cousins)
"Inside Your Hell Tonight" (Dave Lambert)
"The Golden Salamander" (Cousins)
"The River" (Cousins)
"Down by the Sea" (Cousins)
"The Flower and the Young Man" (Cousins)
"Benedictus" (Cousins)
"Alice's Song" (Cathryn Craig, Brian Willoughby)

Personnel
Dave Cousins – lead vocals, backing vocals, acoustic guitar, dulcimer, banjo
Dave Lambert – lead vocals, backing vocals, acoustic guitar
Brian Willoughby – acoustic guitar

Additional personnel
Robert Kirby – string arrangements on tracks 4, 8 and 14
Howard Gott – violin
Ruth Gottlieb – violin
Sophi Sirotia – viola
Sarah Willson – cello
Andy Waterworth – double bass

Recording
Recorded at KD's Studio, Chiswick, London in 

Kenny Denton – engineer

Release history

References
Baroque and Roll on Strawbsweb

Strawbs albums
2001 albums